Forrest O. Rednour (1923–1943) was a United States Coast Guardsman who received the Navy and Marine Corps Medal posthumously for his actions during World War II.

Biography
Forrest Oren Rednour was born in Cutler, Illinois, on 13 May 1923. He enlisted in the United States Coast Guard in Chicago, Illinois, on 19 June 1941.

During the predawn darkness of 3 February 1943, Rednour, wearing a rubber suit to ward off hypothermia, was among the members of the crew of the United States Coast Guard Cutter USCGC Escanaba (WPG-77) who voluntarily subjected themselves to pounding seas and bitter cold in the winter North Atlantic darkness for nearly four hours to rescue survivors from the torpedoed troop transport . Realizing the "... danger of being crushed between the rafts and the ship's side, or of being struck by a propeller blade if the engines backed, he swam in under the counter of the constantly maneuvering Escanaba and prevented many floating survivors from being caught in the suction of the screws, in one instance retrieving a loaded raft." Rednour worked the longest of all retrievers and accounted for the greatest number of survivors, but finally had to quit when his rubber suit became torn.

Rednour perished early on the morning of 13 June 1943 when Escanaba disintegrated in a massive explosion of undetermined cause in the North Atlantic Ocean off Ivituut, Greenland, with a loss of 101 of the 103 men aboard.

Awards
Rednour was posthumously awarded the Navy and Marine Corps Medal for heroic action during the Dorchester rescue operations of 3 February 1943.

Namesakes
The United States Navy destroyer escort USS Rednour (DE-592) was named for Forrest Rednour.  She was converted into a high-speed transport during construction and was in commission as such as USS Rednour (APD-102) from 1944 to 1946.

The United States Coast Guards Forrest O. Rednour Memorial Award Program For Excellence in Food Service/Food Service Specialist of the Year also is named for Rednour.

In 2015 it was announced that the Sentinel-class fast response cutter USCGC Forrest Rednour (WPC-1129) would bear his name.

Notes

References

United States Coast Guard Historian's Office: Tethered Rescue Swimmers
 United States Coast Guard Commandant Notice 1650 "Forrest O. Rednour Memorial Award Program For Excellence in Food Service/Food Service Specialist of the Year," dated 14 May 2009

External links

1923 births
1943 deaths
Recipients of the Navy and Marine Corps Medal
United States Coast Guard non-commissioned officers
United States Coast Guard personnel killed in World War II
People from Perry County, Illinois
Military personnel from Illinois